This is a categorised, alphabetical list of notable people who have been diagnosed with lupus.

Lupus is a collection of autoimmune diseases in which the human immune system becomes hyperactive and attacks healthy tissues. Symptoms of these diseases can affect many different body systems, including joints, skin, kidneys, blood cells, heart, and lungs. The most common and most severe form is systemic lupus erythematosus (SLE).

Confirmed diagnosis

Sports 

 Shannon Boxx, diagnosed in 2007
 Tim Raines, former major league baseball player
Juli Furtado, champion professional mountain biker

Music 

 J Dilla (also known as Jay Dee), hip-hop producer and beat maker; died of SLE complications in 2006
 Kéllé Bryan, diagnosed in 1998
Lucy Vodden, inspiration for the Beatles song "Lucy in the Sky with Diamonds"; since becoming aware of this, Julian Lennon has campaigned to raise awareness of lupus
Michael Jackson, had both SLE and vitiligo; diagnosed in 1986, and confirmed by his dermatologist, Arnold Klein, who presented legal documents during court depositions
Nick Cannon, American actor and former presenter of America's Got Talent
Seal, British singer-songwriter
Selena Gomez, American singer and actress
Teddi King, American singer; died of SLE complications in 1977
 Toni Braxton, American singer, was hospitalized in Los Angeles in December 2012 because of "minor health issues" related to lupus

Stage and screen 
 Siaara Freeman, poet and playwright
 Tonya Ingram, performance poet
 Sally Hawkins, actress
 Charles Kuralt, former anchor of CBS Sunday Morning, died of SLE complications in 1997
 Lauren Shuler Donner, American movie producer
Mary Elizabeth McDonough, American actress; believes her SLE to be due to silicone breast implants
 Michael Wayne, Hollywood director and producer; part owner of Batjac Productions; son of John Wayne, died of heart failure resulting from SLE complications in 2003
 Ray Walston, character actor who died of SLE complications in 2001 after a six-year battle with the disease

Modelling 

 Mercedes Scelba-Shorte, America's Next Top Model Season Two runner-up and model
 Sophie Howard, British glamour model

Politics 

 Ferdinand Marcos, former Philippine president, died of SLE complications in 1989
 Hugh Gaitskell, British politician; died of SLE complications in 1963 aged 56

Other 

 Donald Byrne, American chess player who died from SLE complications in 1976
 Flannery O’Connor, American author who died of SLE complications in 1964

Retrospective diagnosis 

 Louisa May Alcott, American author best known for her novel Little Women, has been suggested to have had SLE.

References 

Lupus